Bór  is a settlement in the administrative district of Gmina Zwierzyniec, within Zamość County, Lublin Voivodeship, in eastern Poland.

The settlement has a population of 48.

References

Villages in Zamość County